Thelosia postflavida is a moth in the family Apatelodidae. It was described by Max Wilhelm Karl Draudt in 1929, with a type locality in Brazil.

References

Apatelodidae
Moths described in 1929
Moths of South America